Newell is a coastal town and rural locality in the Shire of Douglas, Queensland, Australia. It is a sugarcane growing district.

Geography 

The locality is bounded to the west by the Mossman Daintree Road and a cane tramway line to the Mossman Sugar Mill and to the east by the Coral Sea. It is partly bounded to the north by Coop Creek and Saltwater Creek and to the south by the Mossman River, which enters the Coral Sea at the south-eastern point of the locality. The town is spread along on the coastline with most houses only two streets from the beach. The remainder of the land, all of which is low-lying, is predominantly used for agriculture, mostly sugarcane.

History 

The town is named after prominent local business man and politician John Newell.

Education 
There are no schools in Newell, but there are primary and secondary schools in neighbouring Mossman so the south-west.

Amenities 
Despite its name, the Mossman Golf Course is located in Newell on the north-east corner of the Mossman Daintree Road and Newell Road.

There is a  boat ramp and jetty at the southern end of Rankin Street on the north bank of Mossman River Heads. It is managed by the Douglas Shire Council.

References 

Towns in Queensland
Shire of Douglas
Coastline of Queensland
Localities in Queensland